Khaemwaset was an ancient Egyptian prince of the 18th Dynasty. He is likely to have been a son of Pharaoh Amenhotep II.

He is mentioned on two graffiti along with the throne name of Amenhotep II. He is titled Overseer of cattle, which was a rare title for a prince.

Sources

Princes of the Eighteenth Dynasty of Egypt
Children of Amenhotep II
Ancient Egyptian overseers of the cattle